Dennis Curling (birth unknown) is a Welsh former rugby union and professional rugby league footballer who played in the 1970s.

International honours
Dennis Curling won a cap for Wales (RL) while at Warrington in 1977 (interchange/substitute).

References

External links
Statistics at wolvesplayers.thisiswarrington.co.uk

Living people
Aberavon RFC players
Footballers who switched code
Place of birth missing (living people)
Rugby league wingers
Rugby union wings
Wales national rugby league team players
Warrington Wolves players
Welsh rugby union players
Welsh rugby league players
Year of birth missing (living people)